The SS Gulfamerica was an American steam tanker built by Bethlehem-Fairfield Shipyards Inc, of Sparrow's Point, Maryland and completed in March 1942. She was operated by the Gulf Oil Company of New York City and homeported in Philadelphia.

Sinking
Gulfamericas maiden voyage was to take her from Port Arthur, Texas, to New York, carrying a cargo of 101,500 barrels of furnace oil. She was illuminated by the lights of the Jacksonville Beach resort, which at that time was not observing a blackout. Just after 10 pm, the decision was made to stop steaming an evasive zigzag course.

The torpedo struck at the #7 tank on the starboard side and caused a large explosion and subsequent fire. The engines were stopped and the order to abandon ship was given, as the Gulfamerica sent distress calls. U-123 then opened fire with her deck gun, firing about 12 shells into the engine room on the port side in an attempt to bring down the radio antenna and the anti-aircraft gun. The evacuation descended into confusion, causing a lifeboat to capsize, while another with the master and ten crewmen hurriedly pulled away in ten minutes. Ten minutes later another boat left with only three men aboard, while three others abandoned ship on a liferaft, later picking up two men from the water.

Five men were killed by the torpedo blast or the gunfire, with 14 men drowning after they had entered the water. A total of two officers, two armed guards and 15 crewmen were killed in the sinking. The survivors were all rescued by US Coast Guard patrol boats and taken to Mayport, Florida. The Gulfamerica settled by the stern with about a 40° list to starboard but did not sink until 16 April.

Humane considerations
After the initial torpedo strike, the commander of U-123, Kapitänleutnant Reinhard Hardegen, surfaced his boat to finish the stricken tanker. In doing so he realised that they were close to the highly illuminated and populated coast of Jacksonville, and that there was the risk that if he fired, shots that flew over the Gulfamerica could hit the shore, putting civilian lives at risk. He therefore navigated around the Gulfamerica, placing himself between the shore and the tanker, and ensuring that shots that missed would land in the sea. In doing so, he lost valuable time. The distress call was received, and U-123 was later engaged by the destroyer . U-123 was damaged, but able to make a narrow escape back to Europe.

Hardegen survived the war, and returned to Jacksonville in 1990, where he was received as an honoured guest. He would say of the occasion that "The town was very friendly to me."

Aftermath
The sinking of the Gulfamerica was one in a number of losses to merchant vessels along the North American coast. A wave of hysteria developed, with a fear of spies and saboteurs being landed all along the coast.  Despite the highly illuminated coastline providing easy targets for the U-boats engaged in Operation Drumbeat, it still took a number of months for the government to organise an effective blackout, after which losses dropped. Hardegen spoke of that night, "There was moonshine, how you say, moonlight. There were lights on the shore. And many people."

The Liberty ship  was named after a crewman lost aboard the Gulfamerica.

The Liberty ships  and SS James Kyron Walker were named after crewmen lost aboard the Gulfamerica. They were two of only 17 Liberty ships named after African-Americans during the war.

References

SS Gulfamerica at Uboat.net

Ships sunk by German submarines in World War II
Steamships
Shipwrecks of the Florida coast
1942 ships
Maritime incidents in April 1942
Ships built in Sparrows Point, Maryland